Humboldt Peak is a high mountain summit of the Crestones in the Sangre de Cristo Range of the Rocky Mountains of North America.

The Crestones are a cluster of high summits in the Sangre de Cristo Range, comprising Crestone Peak, Crestone Needle, Kit Carson Peak, Challenger Point, Humboldt Peak, and Columbia Point.

The mountain was named in honor of German naturalist and explorer Alexander von Humboldt.

Climbing
The standard route on the peak is a hike along a trail, with rock scrambling (Class 2) near the summit. The trail climbs the peak from the South Colony Lakes basin, accessed from the east side of the range. This basin is a popular site that is also the base for most climbs of Crestone Peak and Crestone Needle.

See also

List of Colorado fourteeners
List of mountain peaks of Colorado

References

External links

 

Mountains of Colorado
Mountains of Custer County, Colorado
San Isabel National Forest
Sangre de Cristo Mountains
Fourteeners of Colorado
North American 4000 m summits